TMK 201 is a type of four-axle tramcar produced by the Đuro Đaković factory (from Slavonski Brod) that operates in the capital of Croatia, Zagreb. Previously, it was also used in Belgrade from 1970 to 1991. The first tram of this type was received by ZET (the city public transportation company in Zagreb) on December 31, 1973, and the thirtieth-and-last of the type was delivered in June 1974. The new tram model was first put in service on January 22, 1974. Nine vehicles remain actively involved in the transport of passengers, and some were used for the production of TMK 2100 in the 1990s.

Technical
The tram is 14 meters long, a few meters longer than the TMK 101 and with more input power than that model. Its maximum speed is 62 km/h.

References

TMK Trams
Tram vehicles of Croatia
Tram vehicles of Serbia
Đuro Đaković (company)